Middletown Township is a township in Bucks County, Pennsylvania, United States. The population was 46,040 at the 2020 census.  Many sections of Levittown  are located in the southern end of the township. The municipality surrounds the boroughs of Langhorne, Langhorne Manor, Penndel and Hulmeville; much of the township beyond Levittown uses Langhorne  as a mailing address.

Also located within the township is Core Creek Park. The township also has many acres of protected woods, the largest being the woods behind Neshaminy High School. The Neshaminy Creek flows through these woods. There are also some few protected farms, most significantly that of Styer's Orchards, which was saved from turning into the site of 632 homes in the late 1990s.

Sesame Place is located in Middletown Township.

Geography
According to the U.S. Census Bureau, the township has a total area of 19.4 square miles (50.2 km2), of which 19.1 square miles (49.5 km2)  is land and 0.3 square mile (0.7 km2)  (1.39%) is water.

Place names in Middletown Township include Bucktoe, Chicken Foot, Edgewood, Glenlake, Levittown (also in Bristol and Falls Township, and Tullytown Borough), Maple Point, Oxford Valley, Parkland, Pickpocket, Timbucktoo, and Woodbourne.

Natural features include Core Creek, Lake Luxembourg in Core Creek Park, Edge Hill, Langhorne Water Works Run, Neshaminy Creek, and Newtown Creek.

The Fall Line, which separates the Atlantic Coastal Plain region from the Piedmont region, runs through Middletown Township.

History
Middletown Township was formally established in 1692 and originally included within its boundaries the present-day boroughs of Langhorne, Langhorne Manor, Hulmeville, and Penndel.

Middletown Township began as a farming community, with close proximity to trading towns such as Langhorne and Newtown. There are not many significant historical places located in the township apart from homes and farms constructed in the late 18th century.

Middletown Township was sparsely populated before 1950: there were only a little more than 2,000 people in 1930, compared to about 46,000 in 2010. Then William Levitt began his second Levittown, which included land of four municipalities, including that of Middletown. Twelve developments were constructed in the township, with the majority of them containing hundreds of homes. This marked the first planned residential development in the township. Meanwhile, Langhorne Terrace was being constructed out of the Neshaminy Woods. During this decade, the township grow by over 440%, or more than 20,000 new residents. As the decades worn on, hundreds and hundreds of acres of pristine woods, rolling countryside, and productive farms continued to be swallowed into homes and businesses. In the 1970s, the Oxford Valley Mall was constructed, and at the time was named the country's largest mall for a short time.

Growth continues to this day; however, Middletown has taken action. The township preserved hundreds of acres now known as Core Creek Park, which includes the sprawling Lake Luxembourg. Many woodlands and a few farms have also been saved. The township has transformed from a bucolic, rural area to a highly desirable and well-planned community, with low crime and an award-winning school district. This is why the township is still seeing a growing population, attracting many out-of-state residents and international migrants. 

Middletown also benefits from its convenient location, in the near center of the county: Middletown is close to almost any other municipality nearby, including the cities of Philadelphia, Trenton, and Princeton. Both I-295 and U.S. 1 pass through the township, offering its residents an easy commute, with the exception of rush hour traffic, which too has been greatly reduced and continues to be in ongoing road projects.

Edgemont and Harewood and Beechwood are listed on the National Register of Historic Places.

Demographics
In a 2014 estimate, the township was 84.1% Non-Hispanic White, 5.5% Black or African American, 0.2% Native American, 5.0% Asian, 0.2% Some other race, and 1.4% were two or more races. 4.9% of the population were of Hispanic or Latino ancestry.

As of the 2010 census, the township was 88.3% Non-Hispanic White, 3.2% Black or African American, 0.2% Native American, 4.0% Asian, and 1.6% were two or more races. 3.1% of the population were of Hispanic or Latino ancestry.

As of the census of 2000, there were 44,141 people, 15,321 households, and 11,659 families residing in the township.  The population density was 2,309.5 people per square mile (891.8/km2).  There were 15,713 housing units at an average density of 822.1/sq mi (317.5/km2).  The racial makeup of the township was 93.86% White, 2.10% African American, 0.15% Native American, 2.40% Asian, 0.55% from other races, and 0.93% from two or more races. Hispanic or Latino of any race were 1.71% of the population. The Asian population is a fast-growing segment of the township.

There were 15,321 households, out of which 38.2% had children under the age of 18 living with them, 63.3% were married couples living together, 9.3% had a female householder with no husband present, and 23.9% were non-families. 19.4% of all households were made up of individuals, and 7.3% had someone living alone who was 65 years of age or older.  The average household size was 2.81 and the average family size was 3.25.

In the township the population was spread out, with 26.2% under the age of 18, 7.7% from 18 to 24, 29.7% from 25 to 44, 23.4% from 45 to 64, and 13.0% who were 65 years of age or older.  The median age was 38 years. For every 100 females there were 94.9 males.  For every 100 females age 18 and over, there were 90.4 males.

The median income for a household in the township was $63,964, and the median income for a family was $71,271. Males had a median income of $47,244 versus $32,154 for females. The per capita income for the township was $25,213.  About 2.1% of families and 3.3% of the population were below the poverty line, including 2.8% of those under age 18 and 4.7% of those age 65 or over.

Like much of the Delaware Valley, Middletown's immigrant population is skyrocketing. With many new, upscale housing developments, many of the households were bought by foreign-born residents. Middletown's immigrant population largely consists of Indians, Koreans, Mexican Americans and Russians. However many others too, such as Chinese, Hispanics, and Arabs, have growing numbers. Aside from European immigration, Middletown's immigrant population has mostly arrived after 1990.

Transportation

Interstate 295 is the most prominent highway traversing Middletown Township. It follows a generally south-to-north alignment across eastern portions of the township. U.S. Route 1 also traverses the township as a freeway, following a southwest-to-northeast alignment through the center of the township. U.S. Route 1 Business follows the Lincoln Highway parallel and to the south of the US 1 freeway. Pennsylvania Route 213 follows Maple Avenue along an east-west alignment through the center of the township, terminating at US 1 Business near the east edge of the township. Pennsylvania Route 332 briefly enters the northern edge of the township along the Newtown Bypass. Pennsylvania Route 413 follows a generally southeast-to-northwest alignment through the center of the township, utilizing several roadways. Finally, Pennsylvania Route 513 briefly enters the township as it travels between Penndel and Hulmeville.

SEPTA Regional Rail's West Trenton Line runs through Middletown Township, with the Woodbourne station located in the township and the Langhorne station located nearby in Langhorne Manor.

Politics
The township was once dominated by the Republican Party like most of Bucks County, due to a more bucolic, rural feel. However, after years of growth, Democratic Chairman John Toth and migration of peoples from Democratic areas, the area has been trending Democratic rapidly, along with Bucks County. The Neshaminy School Board and Middletown Township Board of Supervisors both lack a one party dominance, which used to be mostly or all Republican. 
In the 2006 mid-term elections, Ed Rendell (Governor), Bob Casey (U.S. Senator) and Chris King (Pennsylvania's 142nd Representative District), who are all Democrats won the township. The heavily battled election between Mike Fitzpatrick and Patrick Murphy for the 8th Congressional district was split 50/50 like much of the area.

Education
Middletown Township lies within the Neshaminy School District. Students living within township boundaries may attend either Albert Schweitzer Elementary School, Herbert Hoover Elementary School, Pearl S. Buck Elementary School, Tawanka Elementary School, or Walter Miller Elementary School for grades K-4, depending on where they live. Carl Sandburg Middle School and Maple Point Middle School serve students in grades 5–8, and Neshaminy High School serves students in grades 9-12.

Cairn University, a private religious university, is partially located within township boundaries.

Retail

The Oxford Valley Mall is at the center of a vibrant commercial retail area.  The area surrounding the mall has grown and has changed significantly in the past twenty years. Mainly car dealerships and car automotive shops were once the only structures around the mall. Today over 30 car dealerships remain, but many have been demolished for the new waves. Over 40 restaurant chains are in the vicinity, along with many major retail stores, such as Target, Best Buy, Wal-Mart, Home Depot, Staples, and Barnes & Noble. A surplus of furniture stores are also located here, along with various hotel chains, a major hospital, and office buildings. Many homes have been constructed around the mall, the oldest being Langhorne Gardens, a branch of Levittown, Pennsylvania. Many newly constructed townhouses, condos, and large single-family homes have been built. Traffic has become a major concern. Nearby U.S. 1 and Interstate 295 allow commuters to congest the mall area roads, along with the surplus of residents in the area. Over 400,000 people reside less than ten minutes from the mall, plus the many commuters from nearby New Jersey. Many major construction projects are planned for the major access roads. There is a significant, and fast-growing foreign presence in the area. As thousands of people from other continents have settled near the mall, there is a wide variety of ethnic food, churches, and superstores in its vicinity.

Middletown Township is the home to the corporate headquarters of McCaffrey's Food Markets, an upscale regional grocery store chain which has five locations in Pennsylvania (Yardley, Newtown, Doylestown, Blue Bell, and New Hope), and two locations in New Jersey (Princeton, and West Windsor).

Housing
Middletown has a large mix of housing construction and time periods, which range from the fifties to new construction. Almost all the development that occurred in the fifties were the Levittown sections. Housing ranges from cheap single-family housing to exorbitant single-family living, and also townhomes, condos, assisted living, apartment complexes, deluxe apartment complexes, and 55+ housing. There are no trailer parks in Middletown. There are a handful of homes constructed before 1950, even a few dating back to the 18th century, however they are individual homes and scattered, due to Levittown being the first planned development. The most significant area with scattered housing periods is the area of Parkland. Houses date from every decade of the 20th century, and the 21st. Parkland has the lowest land value and family incomes than any other area of Middletown.

Climate
According to the Köppen climate classification system, Middletown Township has a Hot-summer, Humid continental climate (Dfa). Dfa climates are characterized by at least one month having an average mean temperature ≤ , at least four months with an average mean temperature ≥ , at least one month with an average mean temperature ≥  and no significant precipitation difference between seasons. Although most summer days are slightly humid in Middletown Township, episodes of heat and high humidity can occur with heat index values > . The average wettest month is July which corresponds with the annual peak in thunderstorm activity. Episodes of extreme cold and wind can occur with wind chill values < . Ice storms and large snowstorms depositing ≥  of snow occur once every few years, particularly during nor’easters from December through February.

Ecology
According to the A. W. Kuchler U.S. potential natural vegetation types, Middletown Township would have a dominant vegetation type of Appalachian Oak (104) with a dominant vegetation form of Eastern Hardwood Forest (25). The spring bloom typically begins by April 7 and fall color usually peaks by November 3.

References

External links

 Middletown Township

Townships in Bucks County, Pennsylvania
Townships in Pennsylvania